The following is a list of Toronto Argonauts all time records and statistics current to the 2022 CFL season. Each category lists the top five players, where known, except for when the fifth place player is tied in which case all players with the same number are listed.

Grey Cup Championships

as a Player
6 - Jack Wedley
5 - Joe Krol, Bill Zock, Les Ascott
4 - Royal Copeland
3 - Teddy Morris, Frankie Morris, Bill Stukus, Wes Cutler, Pinball Clemons, Mike O'Shea, Paul Masotti, Adrion Smith, Noah Cantor

as a Head Coach
3 - Lew Hayman, Teddy Morris
2 - Frank Clair, Don Matthews

Games Played 

222 – Don Moen (1982–94)
208 – Noel Prefontaine (1998–2007, 2010–13)
205 – Mike O'Shea (1996–99, 2001–08)
204 – Danny Nykoluk (1955–71)
199 – Jeff Johnson (2000–13)

195 – Chad Folk (1997–2008)
189 – Paul Masotti (1988–99)
186 – Michael Clemons (1989–2000)
175 – Dan Ferrone (1981–92)
166 – Adrion Smith (1996–2005)

Scoring 

Most Points – Career
1498 – Lance Chomyc (1985–93)
1228 – Noel Prefontaine (1998–2007, 2010–13)
899 – Zenon Andrusyshyn (1971–77, 1980–82)
550 – Dick Shatto (1954–65)
549 – Mike Vanderjagt (1996–97, 2008)

Most Points – Season
236 – Lance Chomyc – 1991
207 – Lance Chomyc – 1988
200 – Lance Chomyc – 1990
198 – Mike Vanderjagt – 1996
193 – Lance Chomyc – 1987

Most Points – Game
27 – Cookie Gilchrist – versus Montreal Alouettes, October 30, 1960
26 – Lance Chomyc – versus Ottawa Rough Riders, October 14, 1988
24 – six players, seven times, most recently Derrell Mitchell – versus BC Lions, September 12, 1998

Most Touchdowns – Career
91 – Dick Shatto (1954–65)
85 – Michael Clemons (1989–2000)
74 – Derrell Mitchell (1997–2003, 2007)
53 – Darrell K. Smith (1986–92)
50 – Terry Greer (1980–85)

Most Touchdowns – Season
20 – Darrell K. Smith – 1990
18 – Lester Brown – 1984
18 – Robert Drummond – 1997
17 – Robert Drummond – 1996
17 – Derrell Mitchell – 1997

Most Touchdowns – Game
4 – Dick Shatto – versus Hamilton Tiger-Cats, October 3, 1958
4 – Bill Symons – versus Ottawa Rough Riders, September 7, 1970
4 – Darrell K. Smith – versus Hamilton Tiger-Cats, September 29, 1990
4 – Robert Drummond – versus Hamilton Tiger-Cats, November 2, 1996
4 – Robert Drummond – versus Montreal Alouettes, July 31, 1997
4 – Derrell Mitchell – versus BC Lions, September 12, 1998

Most Rushing Touchdowns – Career
39 – Dick Shatto (1954–65)
33 – Bill Symons (1967–1973)
32 – Gill Fenerty (1987–1989)
31 – Michael Clemons (1989–2000)
27 – Robert Drummond (1996–2002)

Most Rushing Touchdowns – Season
14 – James Franklin – 2018
12 – Gill Fenerty – 1987
12 – Robert Drummond – 1997
11 – Robert Drummond – 1996
10 – Lester Brown – 1984
10 – Gill Fenerty – 1987
10 – Gill Fenerty – 1987

Most Rushing Touchdowns – Game
4 – Robert Drummond – at Hamilton Tiger-Cats, November 2, 1996
4 – Robert Drummond – versus Montreal Alouettes, July 31, 1997
3 – Bill Symons – at Ottawa Rough Riders, September 7, 1970
3 – Gill Fenerty – versus Hamilton Tiger-Cats, September 20, 1987
3 – Tracy Ham – at BC Lions, August 12, 1993
3 – Muhammad Shamsid-Deen – at Ottawa Rough Riders, October 16, 1994
3 – Reggie Barnes – versus Ottawa Rough Riders, July 6, 1995
3 – Michael Jenkins – at Saskatchewan Roughriders, July 28, 2001
3 – Chad Kackert – versus Hamilton Tiger-Cats, September 8, 2012

Most Receiving Touchdowns – Career
74 – Derrell Mitchell (1997–2003, 2007)
52 – Dick Shatto (1954–65)
52 – Darrell K. Smith (1986–92)
47 – Terry Greer (1980–85)
46 – Michael Clemons (1989–2000)

Most Receiving Touchdowns – Season
20 – Darrell K. Smith – 1990
17 – Derrell Mitchell – 1997
15 – Al Pfeifer – 1955
14 – Terry Greer – 1984
14 – Derrell Mitchell – 2000

Most Receiving Touchdowns – Game
4 – Royal Copeland – at Montreal Alouettes, October 27, 1945
4 – Darrell K. Smith – versus Hamilton Tiger-Cats, September 29, 1990
4 – Derrell Mitchell – versus BC Lions, September 12, 1998
3 – eight players, ten times, most recently Jason Barnes – versus Winnipeg Blue Bombers, October 19, 2012

Most Interception Return Touchdowns – Career
9 – Byron Parker (2005–11)
5 – Ed Berry (1988–92, 1996)
5 – Adrion Smith (1996–05)
5 – Clifford Ivory (2002–06)
4 – Dick Thornton (1967–72)
4 – Chris Edwards – (2021–22)

Most Interception Return Touchdowns – Season
4 – Byron Parker – 2006
3 – Vernon Mitchell – 2000
2 – Dick Thornton – 1969
2 – Dick Thornton – 1971
2 – Clifford Ivory – 2003
2 – Clifford Ivory – 2004
2 – Byron Parker – 2007
2 – Byron Parker – 2011
2 – Chris Edwards – 2021
2 – Chris Edwards – 2022

Most Interception Return Touchdowns – Game
2 – Vernon Mitchell – versus Hamilton Tiger-Cats, October 7, 2000
2 – Byron Parker – at Hamilton Tiger-Cats, September 9, 2006

Passing 

Most Passing Yards – Career
20,205 – Ricky Ray (2012–2018) 
16,619 – Condredge Holloway (1981–86) 
13,974 – Damon Allen (2003–07) 
13,261 – McLeod Bethel-Thompson (2017–19, 2021–22) 
11,225 – Doug Flutie (1996–97) 

Most Passing Yards – Season
5,720 – Doug Flutie – 1996
5,546 – Ricky Ray – 2017
5,505 – Doug Flutie – 1997
5,082 – Damon Allen – 2005
4,991 – Kerwin Bell – 1998

Most Passing Yards – Game
524 – Tobin Rote – versus Montreal Alouettes, August 19, 1960
522 – Ronnie Knox – versus Ottawa Rough Riders, October 25, 1958
506 – Ricky Ray – versus Hamilton Tiger-Cats, June 25, 2017
505 – Ricky Ray – versus Winnipeg Blue Bombers, October 24, 2013
501 – Kerwin Bell – versus Edmonton Eskimos, September 26, 1998

Most Pass Attempts – Career
2,476 – Ricky Ray (2012–2018)
1,988 – Condredge Holloway (1981–86)
1,713 – Damon Allen (2003–07)
1,683 – McLeod Bethel-Thompson (2017–19, 2021–22)
1,350 – Doug Flutie (1996–97)

Most Pass Attempts – Season
677 – Doug Flutie – 1996
673 – Doug Flutie – 1997
668 – Ricky Ray – 2017
620 – Ricky Ray – 2014
579 – McLeod Bethel-Thompson – 2022

Most Pass Attempts – Game
55 – Ricky Ray – versus Ottawa Redblacks, July 24, 2017
54 – Tobin Rote – versus Montreal Alouettes, August 19, 1960
53 – Condredge Holloway – versus Winnipeg Blue Bombers, October 11, 1982
53 – Kent Austin – versus Winnipeg Blue Bombers, August 3, 1985
53 – Kerwin Bell – versus Saskatchewan Roughriders, September 15, 2000

Most Pass Completions – Career
1,757 – Ricky Ray (2012–2018)
1,149 – Condredge Holloway (1981–86)
1,125 – McLeod Bethel-Thompson (2017–19, 2021–22)
1,051 – Damon Allen (2003–07)
864 – Doug Flutie (1996–97)

Most Pass Completions – Season
474 – Ricky Ray – 2017
434 – Doug Flutie – 1996
430 – Doug Flutie – 1997
425 – Ricky Ray – 2014
387 – McLeod Bethel-Thompson – 2022

Most Pass Completions – Game
40 – Ricky Ray – versus Ottawa Redblacks, July 24, 2017
39 – Ricky Ray – versus Winnipeg Blue Bombers, October 24, 2013
38 – Tobin Rote – versus Montreal Alouettes, August 19, 1960
37 – McLeod Bethel-Thompson – versus Winnipeg Blue Bombers, August 1, 2019
36 – Condredge Holloway – versus Winnipeg Blue Bombers, October 11, 1982
36 – Kerwin Bell – versus Saskatchewan Roughriders, September 15, 2000
36 – McLeod Bethel-Thompson – versus Montreal Alouettes, August 25, 2019

Most Consecutive Pass Completions - Game
21 – Ricky Ray – versus Winnipeg Blue Bombers, October 24, 2013
17 – Mike Rae – versus Montreal Alouettes, August 27, 1975
17 – Ricky Ray – versus Edmonton Eskimos, August 18, 2013
15 – Ricky Ray – versus Montreal Alouettes, August 19, 2017
13 – Damon Allen – versus Calgary Stampeders, October 16, 2004

Highest Pass Completions Percentage – Career (minimum 300 attempts)
71.0 – Ricky Ray (2012–2018)
69.8 – Trevor Harris (2012–15)
66.8 – McLeod Bethel-Thompson (2017–19, 2021–22)
64.0 – Doug Flutie (1996–97)
63.6 – Kerwin Bell (1998–2001)

Highest Pass Completions Percentage – Season (minimum 175 attempts)
77.2 – Ricky Ray – 2013 (CFL record)
74.5 – Ricky Ray – 2016
71.0 – Trevor Harris – 2015
71.0 – Ricky Ray – 2017
68.6 – Ricky Ray – 2012

Highest Pass Completions Percentage – Game (minimum 20 attempts)
95.0 – Ricky Ray 19 of 20 – versus Winnipeg Blue Bombers, July 19, 2013 (CFL record)
88.9 – Trevor Harris 24 of 27 – versus Edmonton Eskimos, June 27, 2015
87.1 – Condredge Holloway 27 of 31 – versus Saskatchewan Roughriders, July 12, 1985
86.8 – Ricky Ray 33 of 38 – versus Calgary Stampeders, September 13, 2014
86.7 – Ricky Ray 39 of 45 – versus Winnipeg Blue Bombers, October 24, 2013

Most Passing Touchdowns – Career
114 – Ricky Ray (2012–2018)
98 – Condredge Holloway (1981–86)
77 – Damon Allen (2003–07)
76 – Doug Flutie (1996–97)
70 – McLeod Bethel-Thompson (2017–19, 2021–22)

Most Passing Touchdowns – Season
47 – Doug Flutie – 1997
38 – Tobin Rote – 1960
33 – Damon Allen – 2005
33 – Trevor Harris – 2015
32 – Arnold Galiffa – 1956

Most Passing Touchdowns – Game
7 – Tobin Rote – versus Montreal Alouettes, October 1, 1960
7 – Tobin Rote – versus Montreal Alouettes, October 30, 1960
7 – Rickey Foggie – versus Hamilton Tiger-Cats, September 29, 1990
6 – Joe Barnes – versus Edmonton Eskimos, July 22, 1984
6 – Doug Flutie – versus Winnipeg Blue Bombers, September 7, 1997

Highest Passer Rating – Season (minimum 175 attempts)
126.4 – Ricky Ray – 2013 (CFL record)
106.1 – Ricky Ray – 2016
102.9 – Ricky Ray – 2017
102.7 – Damon Allen – 2005
100.7 – Zach Collaros – 2013
100.7 – Trevor Harris – 2015

Best TD to INT ratio – Season (minimum 12 TD)
10.5 – Ricky Ray – 21 TDs 2 INTs – 2013 (CFL record)
4.2 – Rickey Foggie – 21 TDs 5 INTs – 1990
3.6 – Condredge Holloway – 18 TDs 5 INTs – 1982
3.0 – Damon Allen – 12 TDs 4 INTs – 2004

Rushing 

Most Rushing Yards – Career
6958 – Dick Shatto (1954–65)
5232 – Michael Clemons (1989–2000)
4280 – Bill Symons (1967-73)
3712 – Ulysses Curtis (1950–54)
3348 – Michael Jenkins (2000–01, 2003)

Most Rushing Yards – Season 
1484 – Michael Jenkins – 2001
1359 – Cory Boyd – 2010
1247 – Gill Fenerty – 1989
1141 – Cory Boyd – 2011
1134 – Robert Drummond – 1997
1107 – Bill Symons – 1968 
1055 – Doyle Orange – 1975
1050 – Michael Jenkins – 2000
1031 – Jamal Robertson – 2009
1009 – Brandon Whitaker – 2016

Most Rushing Yards – Game
215 – Gill Fenerty – versus Calgary Stampeders, August 31, 1988
208 – Ulysses Curtis – versus Montreal Alouettes, September 6, 1952
202 – Corky Tharp – versus Ottawa Rough Riders, October 29, 1955
195 – Michael Jenkins – versus Edmonton Eskimos, August 17, 2003
190 – James Wilder Jr. – versus Edmonton Eskimos, September 17, 2017

Most Rushing Attempts – Career
1322 – Dick Shatto (1954–65)
1081 – Michael Clemons (1989–2000)
807 – Bill Symons (1967-73)
625 – Gill Fenerty (1987-89)
610 – Michael Jenkins (2000–01, 2003)

Most Rushing Attempts – Season 
271 – Michael Jenkins – 2001
245 – Gill Fenerty – 1989
226 – Cory Boyd – 2010
209 – Jamal Robertson – 2009
205 – Doyle Orange – 1975

Most Rushing Attempts – Game
37 – Doyle Orange – versus Hamilton Tiger-Cats, August 13, 1975
32 – Dick Shatto – at Hamilton Tiger-Cats, October 8, 1955
32 – Dave Thelen – versus BC Lions, September 25, 1966
29 – Corky Tharp – versus Ottawa Rough Riders, October 29, 1955
28 – William Miller – at Montreal Alouettes, November 9, 1986
28 – Gill Fenerty – versus Calgary Stampeders, August 31, 1988
28 – Michael Jenkins – at Montreal Alouettes, November 5, 2000

Most 100-Yard Rushing Games – Season 
8 – Michael Jenkins – 2001
6 – Bill Symons – 1968
6 – Gill Fenerty – 1989
6 – Cory Boyd – 2010
5 – Leon McQuay – 1971
5 – Cory Boyd – 2011

Receiving 

Most Receiving Yards – Career
9047 – Derrell Mitchell (1997–2003, 2007)
8772 – Paul Masotti (1988–99)
8144 – Darrell K. Smith (1986–92)
7015 – Michael Clemons (1989–2000)
6817 – Terry Greer (1980–85)

Most Receiving Yards – Season
2003 – Terry Greer – 1983
2000 – Derrell Mitchell – 1998
1826 – Darrell K. Smith – 1990
1466 – Terry Greer – 1982
1462 – S. J. Green – 2017

Most Receiving Yards – Game
246 – Terry Greer – versus Hamilton Tiger-Cats, September 10, 1982
244 – Paul Masotti – versus Calgary Stampeders, October 27, 1995
243 – Terry Greer – versus BC Lions, September 10, 1983
230 – Terry Greer – versus Ottawa Rough Riders, August 19, 1983
227 – Manny Hazard – versus Ottawa Rough Riders, August 26, 1993

Most Receptions – Career
682 – Michael Clemons (1989–2000)
609 – Derrell Mitchell (1997–03, 2007)
556 – Paul Masotti (1988–99)
466 – Dick Shatto (1954–65)
465 – Darrell K. Smith (1986–92)

Most Receptions – Season
160 – Derrell Mitchell – 1998
122 – Michael Clemons – 1997
116 – Michael Clemons – 1996
113 – Terry Greer – 1983
104 – S. J. Green – 2017

Most Receptions – Game
16 – Terry Greer – versus Ottawa Rough Riders, August 19, 1983
16 – Derrell Mitchell – versus Edmonton Eskimos, September 26, 1998
15 – Terry Greer – versus Winnipeg Blue Bombers, October 11, 1982
15 – Mike Clemons – versus BC Lions, October 4, 1997
14 – Derrell Mitchell – versus Saskatchewan Roughriders, September 15, 2000

Interceptions 

Most Interceptions – Career
47 – Reggie Pleasant (1986–94)
44 – Adrion Smith (1996–05)
41 – Jim Rountree (1958–67)
37 – Carl Brazley (1983–92)
30 – Orlondo Steinauer (2001–07)

Most Interceptions – Season
10 – Bill McFarlane – 1954
10 – Jim Rountree – 1960
9 – Reggie Pleasant – 1987
9 – Reggie Pleasant – 1989
9 – Reggie Pleasant – 1990
9 – Ed Berry – 1992

Most Interceptions – Game
4 – Art Johnson – versus Montreal Alouettes, October 7, 1961
3 – seven players, nine times, most recently Jamal Peters – versus Hamilton Tiger-Cats, August 26, 2022

Most Interception Return Yards – Career
781 – Reggie Pleasant (1986–94)
750 – Adrion Smith (1996–05)
744 – Byron Parker (2005–09, 2010–11)
710 – Orlondo Steinauer (2001–07)
590 – Ed Berry (1988-92, 1996)

Most Interception Return Yards – Season
348 – Byron Parker – 2006
238 – Adrion Smith – 2003
209 – Bill McFarlane – 1954
209 – Cassius Vaughn – 2017
184 – Don Wilson – 1991
184 – Khalil Carter – 2006

Most Interception Return Yards – Game
135 – Byron Parker – versus Hamilton Tiger-Cats, September 9, 2006
115 – Eric Harris – versus Montreal Alouettes, September 6, 1977
115 – Cassius Vaughn – versus Calgary Stampeders, August 26, 2017
108 – Antwaun Molden – versus Saskatchewan Roughriders, July 5, 2014
103 – Ed Berry – versus Ottawa Rough Riders, October 14, 1988

Longest Interception Return
115 – Eric Harris – versus Montreal Alouettes, September 6, 1977
115 – Cassius Vaughn – versus Calgary Stampeders, August 26, 2017
108 – Antwaun Molden – versus Saskatchewan Roughriders, July 5, 2014
100 – A. J. Jefferson – versus Saskatchewan Roughriders, July 5, 2015
94 – Don Wilson – versus Winnipeg Blue Bombers, August 6, 1992

Tackles 
 Note: Tackles were first recorded in 1987, but there was no differentiation between Defensive and Special Teams tackles. Those categorical differences were added in 1991.

Most Defensive Tackles – Career
822 – Mike O'Shea (1996–99, 2001–08)
703 – Kevin Eiben (2001–11)
503 – Don Moen (1987–94)
447 – Reggie Pleasant (1987–94)
441 – Orlondo Steinauer (2001–2008)

Most Defensive Tackles – Season
121 – Calvin Tiggle – 1994
117 – Chris Gaines – 1990
113 – Reggie Pleasant – 1991
113 – Kevin Eiben – 2005
110 – Kevin Eiben – 2004

Most Defensive Tackles – Game
14 – Jeff Braswell – versus Hamilton Tiger-Cats, October 31, 1992
13 – Maurice Miller – versus Edmonton Eskimos, July 23, 1998
13 – Ian Wild – versus BC Lions, July 6, 2019

Most Special Teams Tackles – Career
136 – Bryan Crawford – (2005–2011) 
124 – Mike O'Shea (1996–99, 2001–08)

Most Special Teams Tackles – Season
33 – Kevin Eiben – 2003
30 – Mike O'Shea – 1997
28 – Ray Mariuz – 2004
27 – Bryan Crawford – 2007
27 – Llevi Noel – 2017
27 – Frank Beltre – 2019

Quarterback Sacks 

Most Sacks – Career
92 – Rodney Harding (1985–94)
51 – Jonathan Brown (2004-09)
44 – Harold Hallman (1988–93)
35.5 – James Curry (1983–85)
34.5 – Don Moen (1982–93)

Most Sacks – Season
22 – James Curry – 1984
18 – Rodney Harding – 1994
15.5 – Rick Mohr – 1983
15 – Harold Hallman – 1989
15 – Elfrid Payton – 2001
14 – Eric England – 2003

Most Sacks – Game
5 – Rodney Harding – versus Edmonton Eskimos, September 25, 1988
4.5 – James Curry – versus Ottawa Rough Riders, August 31, 1984
4 – James Curry – versus Ottawa Rough Riders, August 5, 1984
4 – Harold Hallman – versus Hamilton Tiger-Cats, September 15, 1990
4 – Swift Burch – versus Hamilton Tiger-Cats, August 3, 1995
4 – Lester Smith – versus Winnipeg Blue Bombers, September 7, 1997
4 – Jonathan Brown – versus BC Lions, October 11, 2004

Field goals 

Most Field Goals – Career
337 – Lance Chomyc (1985–93)
263 – Noel Prefontaine (1998–2007, 2010–13)
191 – Zenon Andrusyshyn (1971–77, 1980–82)
112 – Mike Vanderjagt (1996–97, 2008)
101 – Swayze Waters (2012–15)

Most Field Goals – Season
55 – Lance Chomyc – 1991
48 – Lance Chomyc – 1988
48 – Dan Giancola – 1999
47 – Lance Chomyc – 1987
47 – Swayze Waters – 2014

Most Field Goals – Game
7 – Lance Chomyc – at Calgary Stampeders, September 30, 1988
7 – Lance Chomyc – versus Ottawa Rough Riders, October 14, 1988
7 – Noel Prefontaine – versus BC Lions, August 1, 2003
7 – Justin Medlock – versus BC Lions, August 14, 2009
6 – nine times, most recently Lirim Hajrullahu – at Winnipeg Blue Bombers, July 13, 2017

Highest Field Goal Accuracy – Career (minimum 75 attempts)
84.0% (84/100) – Lirim Hajrullahu (2016–17)
80.7% (71/88) – Boris Bede (2021–22)
79.5% (101/127) – Swayze Waters (2012–15)
74.7% (112/150) – Mike Vanderjagt (1996–97, 2008)
74.1% (337/455) – Lance Chomyc (1985–93)

Highest Field Goal Accuracy – Season (minimum 30 attempts)
90.4% (47/52) – Swayze Waters – 2014
88.1% (37/42) – Lirim Hajrullahu – 2016
87.0% (40/46) – Justin Medlock – 2009
84.8% (28/33) – Boris Bede – 2021
84.4% (27/32) – Noel Prefontaine – 2002

Longest Field Goal
57 – Zenon Andrusyshyn – at Saskatchewan Roughriders, September 14, 1980
56 – Boris Bede – versus Hamilton Tiger-Cats, August 26, 2022
55 – Lance Chomyc – versus Saskatchewan Roughriders, November 8, 1987
54 – Zenon Andrusyshyn – versus Calgary Stampeders, July 24, 1975
54 – Zenon Andrusyshyn – versus Edmonton Eskimos, October 11, 1981
54 – Lance Chomyc – versus BC Lions, October 4, 1987
54 – Boris Bede – at Calgary Stampeders, August 7, 2021

Most Consecutive Field Goals
18 – Swayze Waters (August 1, 2014 – October 4, 2014)
17 – Boris Bede (October 22, 2021 – June 16, 2022)
16 – Noel Prefontaine (August 28, 2004 – October 16, 2004)
15 – Noel Prefontaine (June 17, 2006 – August 25, 2006)
14 – Lirim Hajrullahu (July 31, 2016 – September 11, 2016)
14 – Lance Chomyc (November 3, 1985 – July 26, 1986)

Playoff Records 

Games Played

21 – D. "Red" Wilson (1922–30)
16 – Les Ascott (1940-52)

Scoring

Most Points – Career
81 – Noel Prefontaine 
77 – Lance Chomyc 

Most Points – Season
24 - Ulysses Curtis 1950
24 - Ron Morris 1961
24 - Dave Mann 1968

Most Points – Game
24 - Ron Morris – versus Ottawa Rough Riders, November 11, 1961
19 – Lance Chomyc – versus Hamilton Tiger-Cats, November 15, 1987

Most Touchdowns – Career
7 - Ulysses Curtis (1950-52)
6 - Royal Copeland (145-47, 52, 55)

Most Touchdowns – Season
4 - Ron Morris 1961
4 - Ulysses Curtis 1950

Most Touchdowns – Game
4 - Ron Morris – versus Ottawa Rough Riders, November 11, 1961

Rushing

Most Rushing Yards – Career

Most Rushing Yards – Season 

Most Rushing Yards – Game

Passing

Most Passing Yards – Career

Most Passing Yards – Season

Most Passing Yards – Game

Most Pass Completions – Career

Most Pass Completions – Season

Most Pass Completions – Game
38 – Kerwin Bell – versus Montreal Alouettes, November 8, 1998
30 – Doug Flutie – versus Montreal Alouettes, November 17, 1996

Most Consecutive Pass Completions - Game

Most Passing Touchdowns – Career
9 – Tobin Rote (1960-61)

Most Passing Touchdowns – Season
7 – Tom Dublinski – 1955 (2 games)

Most Passing Touchdowns – Game
4 - by 3 players

Receiving

Most Receiving Yards – Career

Most Receiving Yards – Season

Most Receiving Yards – Game

Most Receptions – Career

Most Receptions – Season

Most Receptions – Game
16 – Derrell Mitchell – versus Montreal Alouettes, November 8, 1998
10 - Cedric Minter - versus Hamilton Tiger-Cats, November 20, 1983

Tackles (since 1987)

Most Tackles – Career

Most Tackles – Season
18 – Keith Castello – 1990

Most Tackles – Game
10 – Keith Castello – versus Ottawa, November 11, 1990

Interceptions

Most Interceptions – Career
47 – Reggie Pleasant (1986–94)

Most Interceptions – Season
10 – Bill McFarlane – 1954

Most Interceptions – Game
3 – Darell Moir – versus Hamilton Tiger-Cats, November 16, 1986

Most Interception Return Yards – Career

Most Interception Return Yards – Season

Most Interception Return Yards – Game

Quarterback Sacks

Most Sacks – Career

Most Sacks – Season

Most Sacks – Game
3.5 – James Curry – versus Hamilton Tiger-Cats, November 11, 1984

References 

Toronto Argonauts Records
2017 Toronto Argonauts Media Guide
CFL Guide & Record Book, 2017 Edition
CFL.ca

Toronto Argonauts lists
Canadian Football League records and statistics